Supernatural typically refers to unexplained or non-natural forces and phenomena.

Supernatural may also refer to:

Film and television
 
 Supernatural (film), a 1933 film by Victor Halperin starring Carole Lombard
 Supernatural (British TV series), a 1977 BBC anthology drama
 Supernatural (American TV series), a 2005–2020 television series
 Supernatural: The Unseen Powers of Animals, a BBC natural history documentary series

Music

Performers
Supernatural (group), a Swedish pop group consisting of winners from Popstars
Supernatural (rapper) (born 1970), American rapper
The Supernaturals, a pop-rock quintet from Glasgow, Scotland, United Kingdom

Albums
Supernatural (EP), a 1999 EP by Alien Crime Syndicate
Supernatural (DC Talk album) and its title track (1998)
Supernatural (Des'ree album) (1998)
Supernatural (Ben E. King album) (1975)
Supernatural, a 1999 album by Robben Ford 
Supernatural (Santana album), (1999)
Supernatural (Stereo MCs album), (1990)
Supernaturalistic (album), a 2008 album by Sander van Doorn
Supernatural, a 2003 album by Criss Angel

Songs
 "Supernatural" (Wild Orchid song) (1997)
 "Supernatural" (Kesha song) (2012)
 "Supernaturally", a 2004 song by Nick Cave and the Bad Seeds from Abattoir Blues / The Lyre of Orpheus
 "Supernatural", a 2005 song by Sara Evans from Real Fine Place
 "Supernatural", a song by Flyleaf
 "Super Natural", a 2016 song by Danny L Harle featuring Carly Rae Jepsen
 "The Supernatural", a 1967 song by John Mayall & the Bluesbreakers from A Hard Road
 "Supernatural", a 2009 song by Daughtry from Leave This Town
 "Supernatural", a 2010 song by Manafest from The Chase
 "Supernatural", a song by Midnight Youth
 "Supernatural", a 1989 song by New Edition, for Ghostbusters II
 "Supernatural", a 2004 song by Raven-Symoné from That's So Raven
 "Supernatural", a 2005 song by Sara Evans from Real Fine Place
 "Supernatural", a 2002 song by Sugababes from Angels With Dirty Faces
 "Super Natural", a 2017 song by Turnover from Good Nature
 "Supernatural", a 2022 song by Ben Rector

Other uses
 Supernatural fiction, a literary genre
Supernatural: Meetings with the Ancient Teachers of Mankind, a book by Graham Hancock
The Sims 3: Supernatural, a 2012 expansion pack for the video game The Sims 3

See also

The Supernatural (disambiguation)
Supernature (disambiguation)
Supernormal